Kelardasht County is in Mazandaran province, Iran. The capital of the county is the city of Kelardasht. At the 2006 census, the region's population (as Kelardasht Rural District and the city of Kelardasht in Chalus County) was 20,381 in 5,759 households. The following census in 2011 counted 17,350 people in 5,390 households. At the 2016 census, the population in the newly formed Kelardasht County was 23,648 in 8,067 households. Kelardasht corresponds to historical Kelarestaq.

The head of Chalus County council announced the upgrade of Kelardasht Rural District to county status. In an interview with IRNA, Jafar Rostamifar said. "The Board of Ministers at the meeting dated 12/20/1391, based on proposal No. 107532/42/4/1 dated 7/17/1389 of the Ministry of the Interior, and based on Article (13) of the Law on Definitions and Rules of Divisions Kishori, Approved 1362, Kalardasht Rural District in Mazandaran province was upgraded to a county."

Kelardasht County is bordered by Chalus County on the east, Tonekabon County on the west, Abbasabad County on the north, and Alborz province on the south.

Administrative divisions

The population history and structural changes of Kelardasht County's administrative divisions over three consecutive censuses are shown in the following table. The latest census shows one district, two rural districts, and one city.

References

Counties of Mazandaran Province

fa:شهرستان کلاردشت